Alaigal may refer to:
 Alaigal (film)
 Alaigal (TV series)